100 Miles from Memphis is the eighth studio album by American singer-songwriter Sheryl Crow. It is her final release for A&M Records. The album was written and produced by Crow, Doyle Bramhall II and Justin Stanley and features the musicians Tommy Sims and Chris Bruce. On this album she puts aside her country and pop-rock past in favor of a vintage R&B and Memphis soul-inspired record. Although proficient on such instruments as bass, piano and guitar, Crow concentrates on singing throughout the album. The album includes the covers: Citizen Cope's "Sideways", Terence Trent D'Arby's 1988 hit, "Sign Your Name", and The Jackson 5's "I Want You Back". This is the first of Crow's albums not to be nominated for any Grammy Awards (excluding Christmas and greatest hits releases).

Critical reception

100 Miles from Memphis has received "generally favorable reviews" from 14 music critics, as Metacritic gave it 66 out of 100. Knoxville.com calls the album "sonically impressive" and Crow's "most ambitious release so far", although not impressed with her voice, noticing a disconnection with the sound; they gave the album 3.5 stars out of 5.

BBC also gave 100 Miles a positive review, calling it a "mix of white soul, rock, and reggae" and praising the partnership between Crow and producer Doyle Bramhall II. The album is considered to be a nostalgic move for Crow, for a time when soul had an upbeat message. Crow's excitement is noticed throughout the record.

Billboard magazine says "100 Miles is a path Crow was certainly wise to tread", praising her celebratory mind frame and the joyous mood of lead single "Summer Day", as well as "Peaceful Feeling" and first track "Our Love is Fading". Keith Richards' swagger is also noticed on the reggae field "Eye to Eye".

Mojo Magazine finds Crow in a peaceful state of mind, after adopting her two sons, Wyatt Steve and newborn Levi James. At 48, she finally "returns to her roots". Mojo praises producers Doyle Bramhall II and Justin Stanley (Amy Winehouse) in their pursuit of "shimmering Memphis sound" and calls ballads "Stop" and Crow's cover of "Sideways" two of her most "vulnerable and classy performances". The album is rated 4 out of 5 stars.

The album was made BBC Radio 2's "Album of the Week" for the week commencing July 10, 2010.

Commercial performance
In the United States, 100 Miles From Memphis entered the Billboard 200 at number #3 with first week sales of 55,000 copies. It is Crow's eighth top 10 album.

In Canada, the album debuted at #2 on the Canadian Albums Chart, behind Eminem's Recovery. The album was less successful in the UK, once one of Crow's major markets, where it peaked at #34.

Promotion
Crow promoted her new album through media appearances. In the United States, she performed the lead single, "Summer Day", on The Late Show with David Letterman, Good Morning America and Tonight Show with Jay Leno. She also appeared on Lopez Tonight and The View, where she performed "Sign Your Name" and "Long Road Home", respectively.
In the UK, she made appearances on The 5 O'clock Show, Alan Titchmarsh Show and Later...with Jools Holland.

Track listing

Charts

References

External links
 

2010 albums
Sheryl Crow albums
A&M Records albums
Albums recorded at Electric Lady Studios
Soul albums by American artists
Albums produced by Doyle Bramhall II
Albums produced by Justin Stanley